Leidschendam-Voorburg is the RandstadRail station in of Leidschendam-Voorburg, the Netherlands.

History
The station opened, as a railway station, on 1 October 1908 as part of the Hofpleinlijn (Den Haag - Rotterdam Hofplein). From 20 May 1977 the station was also served by services from Den Haag operating on the Zoetermeerlijn, operating Zoetermeer Stadslijn services. The train station closed on 3 June 2006 and reopened as a RandstadRail station on 29 October 2006 for the HTM tram services (3 & 4) and on 11 November 2006 for the RET metro service (line E).

The station features 2 platforms on either side of a viaduct. These have a high and a low platform, with RandstadRail 3 and RandstadRail 4 using the lower platforms, and line E using the higher platforms.

Close to the station, but on the opposite side of the Rijn-Schiekanaal, is Leidschendam Nedtrain depot. Trains used to access this depot along this line, but when the line was converted to RandstadRail, the Nootdorp Boog was built, coming off the Den Haag - Gouda railway line, and NS trains run parallel to the RandstadRail line between the split between the Hofpleinlijn and the Zoetermeerlijn and Leidschendam Depot.

Train services
The following services currently call at Leidschendam-Voorburg:

Bus service
These services departs from street level, to the west of the station.

 Bus 46 (Station Voorschoten - Leidschendam - Station Leidschendam-Voorburg - Station Voorburg - Den Haag Centraal)
 Bus 45 (Station Leiden Centraal - Station Leiden Lammenschans - Voorschoten - Leidschendam - Station Leidschendam-Voorburg - Station Voorburg - Den Haag Centraal)

Railway stations opened in 1908
RandstadRail stations
1908 establishments in the Netherlands
Leidschendam-Voorburg
Railway stations in the Netherlands opened in the 20th century